Sofiya Yulievna Pregel (1894–1972) was a Russian poet. She emigrated to Berlin in 1922 and then to Paris in 1932, where she directed the Rifma publishing house.

Writings
1935. Razgovor s pamiat'iu. Paris: Chisla.
1937. Solnechnyi proizvol. Paris: Sovremennyie zapiski.

References
 Dictionary of Russian Women Writers. 1994. Greenwood Press.

Russian writers
Soviet emigrants to Germany
German emigrants to France
1894 births
1972 deaths
Russian women writers